Sarita Simmons (born May 14, 1977) is an American politician, serving in the Mississippi State Senate from the 13th district since 2020.

Early life and education 
Simmons was born in Cleveland, Mississippi. Her father is Willie Lee Simmons, former Mississippi Senate member from the 13th district and current Central District Transportation Commissioner. Her mother was the Bolivar County Circuit Clerk, the first African American since Reconstruction to serve that post. Simmons attended Cleveland High School and graduated from Alcorn State University with a bachelor's in education and psychology.

Career 
Simmons has worked as the general manager for the family-owned restaurant, The Senator's Place, which is located in Cleveland, Mississippi. When her father didn't file for re-election for the 13th district, she decided to run. The district encompasses parts of Bolivar, Sunflower, and Tallahatchie counties. She received 42.1% of the vote in the Democratic primary election and 65.1% in the general election; she assumed office on January 7, 2020.

In the Mississippi Senate, she serves as vice-chair for the Investigate State Offices Committee and is a member on the following committees: Agriculture; Appropriations; Corrections; Drug Policy; Environment Prot, Cons, and Water Res; Labor; Ports and Marine Resources; and State Library.

Political positions 
Simmons, in partnership with Senator Walter Michel, authored a bill to allow wine sales in grocery stores; the bipartisan bill died in the Senate Finance Committee.

In coordination with several Delta Legislators, Simmons created a multi-step plan to address conditions at the Mississippi State Penitentiary in Sunflower County, an infamous prison located in Simmon's 13th district. This came after lawmakers proposed additional cuts for funding to the Mississippi Department of Corrections.

She voted for changing the Mississippi state flag.

Personal life 
She is a member of the Delta Sigma Theta sorority, NAACP, National Council of Negro Women, and the Bolivar County Democratic Executive Committee. She is a Christian.

References 

1977 births
21st-century American politicians
African-American state legislators in Mississippi
21st-century American women politicians
People from Cleveland, Mississippi
Mississippi Democrats
Living people
African-American women in politics
Alcorn State University alumni
21st-century African-American women
21st-century African-American politicians
20th-century African-American people
20th-century African-American women